The Province of New South Wales is an ecclesiastical province of the Anglican Church of Australia, the boundaries of which are nearly all of state  New South Wales and the Australian Capital Territory. The province consists of seven dioceses: Armidale, Bathurst, Canberra and Goulburn, Grafton, Newcastle, Riverina and Sydney.

The metropolitan of the province is the Archbishop of Sydney. Kanishka Raffel was elected as Archbishop of Sydney and Metropolitan of New South Wales on 6 May 2021 and was consecrated and installed in that role on 28 May 2021.

References

External links 
 List of parishes in New South Wales
 

 
New South Wales